Fawcett Street railway station served the city of Sunderland, Tyne and Wear, England from 1853 to 1879 on the Penshaw branch line.

History 
The station opened on 1 June 1853 by the York, Newcastle and Berwick Railway. It was situated opposite of Mowbray Extension Park. It was the Eastern terminus of the branch line, closing on 4 August 1879 after being replaced by the current  station. The site of the station was replaced by housing.

References 

Disused railway stations in Tyne and Wear
Former North Eastern Railway (UK) stations
Railway stations in Great Britain opened in 1853
Railway stations in Great Britain closed in 1879
1853 establishments in England
1879 disestablishments in England
Transport in the City of Sunderland
Sunderland